Cape York may refer to:
 Cape York (Greenland), a cape at the north-west coast of Greenland, in northern Baffin Bay
 Cape York meteorite, meteorite found in 1894 near Cape York, Greenland
 Cape York Peninsula, a large peninsula located in Queensland, Australia
Cape York (Queensland), the northernmost point of Cape York Peninsula
 Cape York (Mars), a location on the northwest rim of Endeavour crater on the planet Mars